ATAC, or Atac, may refer to:

 Airborne Tactical Advantage Company, a U.S. government contractor which operates foreign military aircraft for training purposes
 Anti-Terrorist Action Command, a fictional police organization in the 1981 movie Nighthawks
 Navy Antiterrorist Alert Center, the 1983–2002 United States Navy terrorism watch center
 "Arimidex, Tamoxifen, Alone or in Combination", an international trial of treatments for localized breast cancer
 Asbestos Testing and Consultancy Association, a UK trade association
 Assay for Transposase-Accessible Chromatin (ATAC-seq), a DNA sequencing technique
 Atac, a French supermarket chain
 ATAC SpA, a public transport company in Rome, Italy
 Automatic targeting attack communicator, a fictional military communication device in the James Bond movie For Your Eyes Only
 Advanced Technology Airborne Computer (ATAC) was a computer used on US naval aircraft and the NASA Galileo (spacecraft).